Svampa is a surname. Notable people with the surname include:

Domenico Svampa (1851–1907), Italian Catholic archbishop 
Maristela Svampa (born 1961), Argentine sociologist